AGN may refer to:
 Active galactic nucleus
 Acute glomerulonephritis
 Agutaynen language
 Allergan (stock symbol AGN)
 Angoon Seaplane Base, Angoon, Alaska, United States
  (General National Archive)